Sultan Günal-Gezer (born 1 May 1961) is a Dutch politician of Turkish descent. As a member of the Labour Party (Partij van de Arbeid) she was a member of the House of Representatives between 8 November 2012 and 23 March 2017. Previously she was an alderman of Uden from 2006 to 2012 and a member of the municipal council of the same municipality from 2002 to 2006.

References

External links 
 
  Sultan Günal-Gezer at the website of the Labour Party
  Sultan Günal-Gezer at the website of the House of Representatives

1961 births
21st-century Dutch politicians
21st-century Dutch women politicians
Aldermen in North Brabant
Labour Party (Netherlands) politicians
Living people
Dutch people of Turkish descent
Members of the House of Representatives (Netherlands)
Municipal councillors in North Brabant
People from Antakya
People from Uden
Turkish emigrants to the Netherlands